The Munshibari was a feudal estate in Kurigram District in the Division of Rajshahi, Bengal (present day Bangladesh). It was founded in the mid-18th century by an official of the Rulers of Bengal.

History
During the period of Brojendra Lal Munshi, a custodian was chosen named Kanai Lal Sarkar. According to him, during the reign of Nawab Shirajuddaula, the sixth Nawab of Bengal, Bihar and Orissa of the Afshar Dynasty, Bonwari Munshi had an employee under the latter, with the title of Munshi.

Bonwari Munshi once had come for hunting to the area of Dharnibari Union by river over the Bamnee. He liked the land and suggested this to the Nawab and requested some for himself, receiving 21.20 acres of land for himself and a further 11.20 acres for Laxmi Narayan. The family hence established the estate with around 34 acres of land under Bonwari Munshi and Laxmi Narayan.

The Islamic Mission and Foundation had taken 7.42 acres of land that had been adjoining the building for almost a century under the Government. There, a hospital and a mosque had been set up for the local people. In addition, some land had been given to local people on an annual lease.

Family
It is said that Bonawari Munshi never had a child which is why, his wife Kadinginee Munshi adopted a son, named Binod to serve the estate's founder, Laxmi Narayan. Binod, as it turned out, was also without an heir. His wife Krishna Kaminee adopted another son called Brojendra Lal for the same cause. Finally, Brojendra Lal Munshi's wife, Asharatha Munshi gave birth to two daughters. The oldest named Shuchi Rani and younger was called Shushama. The latter died young.

Sachi Rani was married off in Kushtia, her family later leaving to live in Kolkata. Her child named as Sushamakanti who along his family lives in Kolkata. Shachis mother Asalata then adopted a male child for the inheriting the estate. After the Bangladesh Liberation War, Bihari Lal Munshi the incumbent head of the family went to Kolkata giving the responsibility of taking care of the Munshi Bari to a local named Saifur Mia, who allegedly handed over the Munshibari to one Arif Mia.

Dissolution and government takeover
Conflict arose among the locals when the caretaker, Arif Mia tried take over the estate. Arif Mia fired his gun and two local students were shot and killed, one of them dying instantly while the other succumbed to his wounds. A case was then filed, and subsequently dismissed.

The Government of Bangladesh then took control of the Munshibari along with all its property. In 1987, the Revenue Office of Dharnibari was placed within the estate where they still operate.

Legacy
The ruins of the estate consist of the Nat Mondir or a play house, Durga temple, Biswanu temple, the dining room and kitchen. There is also the Gobinda Mondir, the drawing room, bedrooms, rest room in the upper floor, bathrooms and Shiva temple. The  people of the locality have been using the pond in the premises for uses while the other portions  are being used by the Government of Bangladesh as offices.

Every year Durga Mela is also held within the Munshibari grounds.

Related houses
The Munshibari of Calcutta, is, according to the book Baranagar: Itihas O Samikshya by Anup Motilal and Ranjankumar Bandopadhyay, had its origins in the days of Warren Hastings (1732 – 1818). Constructed in 1855, the building had been turned into a Retirement home.

Sources

External links
 Journey through Bangladesh From Kurigram- Short history and photos from the Ulipur Munshibari at the Daily Star

Quasi-princely estates of India
Zamindari estates
Dynasties of Bengal
Indian noble families
Bangladeshi families